The Wooldridge-Rose House, located in Pewee Valley, Kentucky, was placed on the National Register of Historic Places in 2007.  It is a c.1905 Colonial Revival-style house, two stories high of considerable size.  Its foundation is limestone block foundation with a roof of tin and shingles, and weatherboard siding.

It was built by Powhatan Wooldridge for one of his daughters, Annie, who chose not to live there.  In 1917 it was purchased by Hugh Rose, a banker.

References

Houses on the National Register of Historic Places in Kentucky
Colonial Revival architecture in Kentucky
Houses completed in 1905
Houses in Oldham County, Kentucky
National Register of Historic Places in Oldham County, Kentucky
1905 establishments in Kentucky